A Thousand Skies is a 1985 Australian mini series about the life of Sir Charles Kingsford Smith.

It was based on the novel The Empty Sky by Tasman Beattie and was partly financed by Film Victoria. The budget was $4.5 million.

References

External links

Australian aviation films
1980s Australian television miniseries
1985 Australian television series debuts
1985 Australian television series endings
1985 television films
1985 films